Varina High School is located in eastern Henrico County, Virginia. It is one of nine high schools in Henrico County Public Schools and was founded in 1909, with the current campus opening in 1963. The school's mascot is the Blue Devil, branded after Duke Blue Devils, and competes in the Virginia High School League as part of the 4A Capital District.

History
Varina School was founded in 1909, the second oldest consolidated school in Virginia, which is now home to Varina Elementary. In 1916, the high school became accredited under the leadership of principal George F. Baker. In 1920, it became the Varina Agricultural High School. The current school opened on the Messer Road campus in 1963. It housed grades seven through twelve until John Rolfe Middle School opened in 1979. In 2009, Varina High School began a three-year, $30-million renovation project of the facility and grounds.

Notable alumni
Andy Allanson, baseball player
Andre Branch, football player
Maurice Canady, football player
Alan-Michael Cash, football player
Tim Harris, football player
Rick Langford, baseball player
Jonathan Lewis, football player
Michael Robinson, football player
Ron C. Smith, football player
Ken Willard, football player
Christopher Darnell Jones Jr., Perpetrator of the University of Virginia shooting

References

External links

Public high schools in Virginia
Schools in Henrico County, Virginia
Educational institutions established in 1909
1909 establishments in Virginia